Grand Forks Public Schools (GFPS) is a system of K-12 schools in Grand Forks, North Dakota, United States. GFPS comprises two school districts: the Grand Forks School District and the Grand Forks Air Force Base School District. There are twelve elementary schools, four middle schools, and two high schools. GFPS also operates an alternative high school, an adult learning center, and a Head Start program. GFPS employs 1,100 people and instructs 7,200 students.

Administration

Current district administration includes:
Terry Brenner - Superintendent of Schools
Jody Thompson - Assistant Superintendent of Elementary Education
Catherine Gillach - Assistant Superintendent of Secondary Education
Scott Berge - Business Manager 
Mark Rerick - Director of Athletics
Mike Stefen - Director of Buildings & Grounds
Eric Ripley - Director of Career and Technical Education
Julie Tunseth - Director of Child Nutrition
Virginia Tupa - Director of Instructional Services
Tricia Lee - Director of Special Services
Joel Schleicher - Director of Technology
Jerry Jonnson - Director of Head Start
	 
Current School Principals include:
Leslie Bjelde- Principal, Ben Franklin Elementary School
Marlon "Buck" Kasowski - Principal, Central High School
Gabe Dahl - Associate Principal, Central High School
Jon Strandell - Associate Principal, Central High School 
Cindy Cochran - Principal, Century Elementary School 
Terry Bohan - Principal, Community Alternative High School
Angie Jonasson - Principal, Carl Ben Eielson Elementary School
Mike LaMoine - Principal, J. Nelson Kelly Elementary School
Roanne Malm - Principal, Lake Agassiz Elementary School
Scott Johnson - Principal, Lewis and Clark Elementary School
Kevin Ohnstad - Principal, Phoenix Elementary School
Kris Arason - Principal, Red River High School
Tony Bina - Associate Principal, Red River High School
Darrin Walters - Associate Principal, Red River High School
Angelique Gunderson - Principal, Elroy Schroeder Middle School
Judy Anderson - Associate Principal, Elroy Schroeder Middle School
Nancy Dutot - Principal, South Middle School
Terry West - Associate Principal, South Middle School
Mary Koopman - Principal, Nathan F. Twining Elementary & Middle School
Todd Selk - Principal, Valley Middle School
Mike Wilber - Associate Principal, Valley Middle School
George Whalen - Principal, Viking Elementary School
Ali Parkinson - Principal, West Elementary School
Travis Thorvilson - Principal, Wilder Elementary School
Travis Thorvilson - Principal, Winship Elementary School

Schools and services

Elementary schools
Ben Franklin Elementary School
Century Elementary School
Discovery Elementary School
J. Nelson Kelly Elementary School
Lake Agassiz Elementary School
Lewis and Clark Elementary School
Nathan F. Twining Elementary School (located on Grand Forks AFB)
Phoenix Elementary School
Viking Elementary School
West Elementary School
Wilder Elementary School
Winship Elementary School

Middle schools
Elroy Schroeder Middle School
Nathan Twining Middle School (located on Grand Forks AFB)
South Middle School
Valley Middle School

High schools
Central High School (Knights)
Red River High School (Rough Riders)
Community High School (alternative high school)

Other services
Adult Learning Center (located in same building as Community High School)
Head Start (pre-school)
Summer Performing Arts Company or SPA (an educational summer theater program)

External links
Grand Forks Public Schools website

Grand Forks, North Dakota
School districts in North Dakota
Education in Grand Forks County, North Dakota